Yengi Esperan (also Romanized as Yengī Esperān and Yengī Asparān; also known as Angilspirān, Isbiran, Safīdān-e Jadīd, Sefīdān-e Jadīd, Sefīdān Jadīd, Yengī Esberān, Yengi Esīrān, and Yengi-Isperan) is a village in Esperan Rural District, in the Central District of Tabriz County, East Azerbaijan Province, Iran. At the 2015 census, its population was 3,515, in 735 families.

References 

Populated places in Tabriz County